The Contax II is a 35 mm rangefinder camera. It was released in 1936 and was the successor of the  original Contax later called the Contax I. It was the first camera with a rangefinder and viewfinder combined in a single window. Its chief designer was Hubert Nerwin. The Nettax was meant to be a cheaper alternative, it was a derivative of the Super Nettel with a rigid body and interchangeable lenses with a specific bayonet and a very limited range of lenses.

The Contax ll was the impressive Zeiss response to the popularity and demand for the Leica 35mm camera. This demand for high quality 35mm picture making tools was based on portability and the increasing availability of 35mm motion picture film, packaged into spools and marketed to amateur as well as professional photographers. The Contax became the 'first choice' among the professional community while the Leica was considered more the choice for well heeled amateurs and practitioners of a more artistic leaning. For example: Robert Capa in the first camp and Alexander Rodchenko in the second.

Zeiss continued to follow their philosophy of designing and building cameras and scientific equipment to the highest standards, having total reliability and the finest optical performance.  The Zeiss lenses of the day were far superior to all their competitors and still enjoy a loyal following among lens aficionados. The 5 cm f/1.5 Sonnar is still considered to be one of the finest lenses ever produced for the 35mm film format. In addition Zeiss quickly marketed a wide range of accessories and additional tools that formed the most extensive camera system of the 1930s, 1940s and early 1950s.

References

External links 

 about Heinz Küppenbender, chief developer of the Contax
 Contax II/III at Cameraquest
 Lionel's Zeiss Ikon Contax II overview at 35mm-compact.com
 Repair notes in Rick Oleson's website:
 Contax (II–III) shutter ribbons (also applies to Kiev 35mm rangefinder models)
 Contax IIa shutter CLA
 Make a takeup spool for your Contax or Kiev (by Henry Fisher)
 Rangefinder Forum – Zeiss Contax

Products introduced in 1936
Contax rangefinder cameras